Camden County Technical Schools Gloucester Township Campus, also called Camden County Tech, is a vocational-technical public high school serving students in ninth through twelfth grades located in Gloucester Township, New Jersey, United States (however it uses a Sicklerville mailing address), that operates as part of the Camden County Technical Schools. The school serves students from all of Camden County, and was opened in 1969 as the district's second high school, with the goal of expanding access in the eastern, more rural portion of Camden County.

As of the 2021–22 school year, the school had an enrollment of 1,459 students and 125.9 classroom teachers (on an FTE basis), for a student–teacher ratio of 11.6:1. There were 425 students (29.1% of enrollment) eligible for free lunch and 74 (5.1% of students) eligible for reduced-cost lunch.

Athletics
The Camden County Tech Warriors compete in the Olympic Conference, an athletic conference comprised of public and private high schools located in Burlington, Camden and Gloucester counties, and operates under the supervision of the New Jersey State Interscholastic Athletic Association (NJSIAA). With 1,003 students in grades 10-12, the school was classified by the NJSIAA for the 2019–20 school year as Group III for most athletic competition purposes, which included schools with an enrollment of 761 to 1,058 students in that grade range. Sister school and archrival, Pennsauken Technical High School Tornadoes also compete in the Olympic Conference.

Administration
The school's principal is Wanda Pichardo. Her administration team includes four assistant principals

References

External links
School webpage
Camden County Technical Schools website

Gloucester Township Technical High School, National Center for Education Statistics

1969 establishments in New Jersey
Educational institutions established in 1969
Gloucester Township, New Jersey
Public high schools in Camden County, New Jersey
Vocational schools in New Jersey